Hydrornis is a genus of pitta in the family Pittidae. The genus contains thirteen species, found in South-east Asia. The genus was formerly merged with the genus Pitta, but a 2006 study split the family into three genera.

Taxonomy
The pittas were at one time all usually placed in the genus Pitta, the only genus in the family Pittidae, but when a 2006 molecular phylogenetic study found that the pittas formed three separate groups, the genus was split and some species were moved into two resurrected genera, Erythropitta and Hydrornis. The genus Hydrornis had been introduced by the English zoologist Edward Blyth in 1843 with the blue-naped pitta (Hydrornis nipalensis) as the type species. The name Hydrornis combines the Ancient Greek words  "water" and  "bird".

The pittas in Hydrornis have sexually dimorphic plumage, a feature that is absent for all other pittas. Also for those species that have been studied, the juveniles have a spotted cryptic plumage.

Species
The genus contains 13 species:

References

 
Bird genera
Birds of Southeast Asia
Taxa named by Edward Blyth